Narendra Kohli (6 January 1940 – 17 April 2021) was an Indian author. Writing in Hindi-language, he is credited with reinventing the ancient form of epic writing in modern prose. He is also regarded as a trendsetter in the sense that he pioneered the creation of literary works based on the Puranas. Because of the large impact of his body of work on Hindi literature, not only is this era of contemporary modern Hindi literature, since about 1975, sometimes referred to as the Kohli Era, his birth anniversary of January 6th is celebrated as Litterateurs' Day or Writers' Day in the Hindi literature world. He died on 17 April due to complications of COVID-19 after he was on a ventilator.

Life
Narendra Kohli was born to Parmananda Kohli and Vidyavanti, a Punjabi Hindu couple in Punjab province of British India. His first school was the Dev Samaj High School in Lahore.  Then he attended the Ganda Singh High School in Sialkot for a few months. In 1947, after the partition of India, the family moved to Jamshedpur (Bihar). He resumed his schooling in third grade at Dhatkidih Lower Primary school. He spent fourth to seventh grade (1949–53) at New Middle English school. Urdu was the medium of instruction for all subjects except English, which was limited to reading and writing. From eighth to eleventh grade, he attended KMPM High School in Jamshedpur. He selected the science stream in high school. The medium of instruction was Urdu till this point.

For higher education, he joined the Jamshedpur Co-operative College. He took the IA exams in 1959 from Bihar University with Compulsory English, Compulsory Hindi, Psychology, Logic, and special Hindi as his subjects. He completed his BA (Hons.) in 1961 from Jamshedpur Co-operative College (Ranchi University) in Hindi. He completed his MA in 1963 at Ramjas College (University of Delhi), and in 1970, received his PhD from the University of Delhi.

He died on 17 April 2021, aged 81 of COVID-19.

Early writings

His first story was in sixth grade for the handwritten class magazine. In eighth grade, his Urdu story Hindostan: Jannat Nishan was published in the school's printed magazine. As a child author, some of his first Hindi stories were published by Kishore (Patna) and Avaaz (Dhanbad). During his IA years, Sarita (Delhi) published his story Paani ka Jug, Gilas aur Ketli in its Nae Ankur ("New Sprouts") column.

After February 1960 his works started getting published regularly. He considered Do Haath published by Kahani (Allahabad) as his first published work.

He wrote a few novels based on the life of families and societies as well. But just portraying the society, or ridiculing its flaws and dilemmas was not going to satisfy him. He realised, that literature cannot reach its ultimate goal just by a narrow, partial and limited display of society, nor can the society benefit from such literature. The demonstration of poor human qualities will only encourage the evil and the foul. Therefore, it must be the goal of literature to demonstrate the great, honourable and moral aspect of life, he believed.

Bibliography
Todo, Kara Todo is a novel based on the life of Swami Vivekananda. One reviewer called it the best on this topic in any of the languages so far.

Vasudeva is a novel describing the life and times of Vasudeva, the father of Krishna; it describes his virtues and draws parallels between that era and the present day. It has been described by critics as a manifesto of a cultural revolution and an epic of human endurance and endeavour.

Work
 Ek aur lal tikon – 1970
 Paanch absurd upanyas – 1972
 Aashriton ka vidroh – 1973
 Jagane ka apradh – 1973
 Pareshaniyan – 1986
 Gantantra ka ganit – 1997
 Aadhunik ladki ki peeda – 1978
 Trasidiyan – 1982
 Mere mohalle ke phool – 2000
 Samagra vyang – 2002
 Sabse bada satya – 2003
 Woh kahan hai – 2003
 Aatma ki pavitrata – 1996
 Meri shreshth vyang rachnayen – 1977
 Samagra natak – 1990
 Samagra vyang (part 1, 2, 3) – 1998
 Samagra kahaniyan (Part 1, 2) – 1991, 1992
 Abhyuday (2 parts) – 1989
 Narendra kohli: Chuni hui rachnayen – 1990
 Narendra kohli ne kaha – 1997
 Meri ekyavan vyang rachnayen – 1997
 Meri terah kahaniyan – 1998
 Na bhuto na bhavishyati – 2004
 Swami vivekanand – 2004
 Das pratinidhi kahaniyan – 2006
 Premchand ke sahitya sidhhant – 1966
 Premchand (aalochana) – 1976
 Parineeti – 1969
 Kahani ka aabhav – 1977
 Drishti desh me ekaek – 1979
 Shatal – 1982
 Namak ka kaidi – 1983
 Nichale flat me – 1984
 Sanchit bhookh – 1985
 Punarambh – 1972
 Aatank – 1972
 Saha gaya dukh – 1974
 Mera apna sansar – 1975
 Deeksha – 1975
 Awsar – 1976
 Jangal ki kahani – 1977
 Sangharsh ki oor – 1978
 Yuddh (2 parts) – 1979
 Abhigyan – 1981
 Aatmadan – 1983
 Preetikatha – 1986
 Mahasamr 1 (Bandhan) – 1988
 Mahasamr 2 (Adhikar) – 1990
 Mahasamr 3 (Karm) – 1991
 Todo kara todo 1 (Nirman) – 1992
 Mahasamr 4 (Dharm) – 1993
 Todo kara todo 2 (Sadhana) – 1993
 Mahasamr 5 (Antaral) – 1995
 Kshama karna jiji – 1995
 Mahasamr 6 (prachhanna) – 1997
 Mahasamr 7 (Pratyaksh) – 1998
 Mahasamr 8 (Nirbandh) – 2000
 Todo kara todo 3 (Parivrajak) – 2003
 Todo kara todo 4 (Nirdesh) – 2004
 Ganit ka prashna – 1978
 Aasan rasta – 1985
 Ek din mathura me – 1991
 Abhi tum bachche ho – 1995
 Kukur – 1997
 Samadhan – 1997
 Shambook ki hatya – 1975
 Nirnay ruka hua – 1985
 Hatyare – 1985
 Gare ki deewar – 1986
 Kishkindha – 1998
 Agastya katha – 1998
 Hatyare – 1999
 Kise Jagau – 1996
 Pratinaad – 1996
 Nepathya – 1983
 Majra kya hai – 1989
 Baba nagarjun – 1987
 Smarami – 2000
 matsyagandha

References

External links

 Official site
 Official Facebook Page for Narendra Kohli's Literature
 Narendra Kohli at Abhivyakti
 Read Mahasamar online
 Basic details of his books
 
 

Novelists from Punjab, India
Hindi-language writers
1940 births
2021 deaths
People from Sialkot
Indian male dramatists and playwrights
Indian satirists
Delhi University alumni
Ranchi University alumni
20th-century Indian novelists
Hindi dramatists and playwrights
Recipients of the Padma Shri in literature & education
20th-century Indian dramatists and playwrights
20th-century Indian male writers
Deaths from the COVID-19 pandemic in India